Philip Mallory Conley (November 30, 1887 – August 1, 1979) was a West Virginian historian, author and teacher. He was born in Charleston, West Virginia. He received his LL.D. degree from Concord University.

Selected bibliography 
 Life in a West Virginia Coal Field, 1923
 Everyday Philosophy.Charleston, W. Va.: West Virginia Pub. Co., 1944.
 Phil Conley and Boyd B. Stutler: West Virginia Yesterday and Today [1931]. 3. ed. Charleston, W. Va.: Education Foundation, 1952.
 Alcibiades. An Autobiography, 1957

References

External links
 Literary manuscript by Phil Conley (West Virginia Division of Culture and History)

1887 births
Historians of West Virginia
Concord University alumni
1979 deaths
Writers from Charleston, West Virginia
20th-century American male writers
Educators from Charleston, West Virginia